Claire Carleton (September 28, 1913 – December 11, 1979) was an American actress whose career spanned four decades from the 1930s through the 1960s. She appeared in over 100 films, the majority of them features, and on numerous television shows, including several recurring roles. In addition to her screen acting, she had a successful stage career.

Early life
Carleton was born in New York City. She began acting on the stage, eventually making it to Broadway, where she made her debut as Lucy in the short-lived play, Blue Monday in June, 1932.

Career
Although she made her film debut in a small role in a 1933 film short, Seasoned Greetings, and continued to occasionally make shorts for the remainder of the decade, she concentrated on her stage career during the 1930s. She made her first appearance in a feature film in 1940's Millionaire Playboy, starring Joe Penner, Linda Hayes, and Russ Brown. During her film career she was often cast as the "other woman", or in a sexually promiscuous role.

Her career ran the gamut of roles, from small, uncredited, unnamed roles, such as a nightclub patron in the 1949 musical, On the Town, to small supporting roles such as Vicki Vale in 1948's If You Knew Susie, 
to small featured roles such as Miss Francis in the classic drama Death of a Salesman (1951), and leading roles such as in Girl from Havana (1940), in which "Havana" was her character's name, and Gildersleeve on Broadway (1943), where she played Francine Gray. She had featured supporting roles in numerous films, among the most notable being: the lead of Kay Stevens in the 1941 Western mystery The Great Train Robbery; as Ruby LaRue in A Night of Adventure (1944), starring Tom Conway; as Belle Townley in the 1946 western, Gun Town, starring Kirby Grant; in one of The Shadow films, The Missing Lady (1946), in the role of Rose Dawson; and Grace in 1949's It's a Great Feeling, starring Doris Day, Jack Carson, and Dennis Morgan.  During the mid-1940s she also starred in a series of two-reelers with Leon Errol, such as 1946's Poppa Knows Worst.

Other notable films in which she appeared include: Rookies in Burma (1943), starring the comedy duo of Wally Brown and Alan Carney, in which she had the featured role of Connie; the 1944 musical Show Business, starring Eddie Cantor and George Murphy; the 1947 comedy The Senator Was Indiscreet, starring William Powell; in George Cukor's A Double Life (1947), starring Ronald Colman; the Fred Astaire and Ginger Rogers musical, The Barkleys of Broadway (1949); in another Cukor film, Born Yesterday, starring Judy Holliday (in an Oscar-winning performance), William Holden, and Broderick Crawford; the 1954 suspense drama, Witness to Murder, starring Barbara Stanwyck, George Sanders, and Gary Merrill; and the biopic, The Buster Keaton Story (1957), starring Donald O'Connor, Ann Blyth, and Rhonda Fleming.

With the advent of television, Carleton transitioned to the small screen in the 1950s, and by the 1960s, she worked almost solely in that medium. Her final big-screen appearance was in 1961's The Devil's Partner, in the featured role of Ida. Carleton's television debut was on the DuMont Television Network's crime drama series Front Page Detective in 1951, in which she had a starring guest appearance in the episode titled, "Frame for Murder". In 1954–5, she co-starred as Nell Mulligan, Mickey Rooney's mother, on The Mickey Rooney Show, though she was only seven years older than Rooney. She had other recurring roles on television, including that of Alice Purdy on Cimarron City, which starred George Montgomery. She appeared as a guest on dozens of other television shows, including Hopalong Cassidy (1952), The Abbott and Costello Show (1953), Mr. & Mrs. North (1953), The Gene Autry Show (1954), Treasury Men in Action (1954-5), Studio 57, The Millionaire (1955-6), The Lone Ranger, several appearances on Schlitz Playhouse, Maverick (1958) with James Garner in the episode "The Lonesome Reunion", Perry Mason (1959) with Raymond Burr, several appearances on M Squad (1959) with Lee Marvin, Leave It to Beaver (1959), Make Room for Daddy (later known as The Danny Thomas Show - 1958 & 1960), several appearances on Alfred Hitchcock Presents from 1956 to 1961, 77 Sunset Strip (1962) with Efrem Zimbalist Jr., Hazel (1962-63) with Shirley Booth, several performances from 1960 to 1965 on Wagon Train, and The Munsters (1964). Her final acting performance was in a small role as a store clerk during the eighth season of the television series The Virginian in 1969.

Personal life
Carleton married Fred E. Sherman, to whom she remained married until his death in 1969. She died from cancer on December 11, 1979, in Northridge, California, and was interred next to her husband at Forest Lawn Memorial Park in Hollywood Hills, California. Carleton was a Democrat who supported Adlai Stevenson's campaign during the 1952 presidential election.

Filmography

(Per AFI database)

 Melody and Moonlight (1940) as Gloria
 The Crooked Road (1940) as Virgie Gobel
 Girl from Havana (1940) as Havana
 Grand Ole Opry (1940) as Ginger Gordon
 Sing, Dance, Plenty Hot (1940) as Evelyn
 The Great Train Robbery (1941) as Kay Stevens
 Petticoat Politics (1941) as Tilly
 Gildersleeve on Broadway (1943) as Francine Gray
 Lady of Burlesque (1943) as Sandra
 Rookies in Burma (1943) as Connie - the Blonde
 The Adventures of a Rookie (1943) as First Nurse (uncredited)
 Around the World (1943) as WAAC Lt. Spencer (uncredited)
 My Pal Wolf (1944) as Ruby, the Cook
 A Night of Adventure (1944) as Ruby LaRue
 Show Business (1944) as Nurse (uncredited)
 Youth Runs Wild (1944) as Taxi Driver (uncredited)
 Bride by Mistake (1944) as Nurse Harrison (uncredited)
 Frontier Gal (1945) as Gracie (uncredited)
 A Close Call for Boston Blackie (1946) as Mamie Kirwin (uncredited)
 Crime Doctor's Man Hunt (1946) as Ruby Farrell
 Gun Town (1946) as Belle Townley
 The Missing Lady (1946) as Rose Dawson
 That Texas Jamboree (1946) as Lulubelle (uncredited)
 Vacation in Reno (1946) as Sally Beaver
 Key Witness (1947) as Receptionist (uncredited)
 Linda, Be Good (1947) as Myrtle
 Too Many Winners (1947) as Mayme Martin
 The Senator Was Indiscreet (1947) as Ingred
 Bodyguard (1948)
 A Double Life (1948)
 I Love Trouble (1948) as Irene Feston - Tired Blonde (uncredited)
 If You Knew Susie (1948) as Steve's Lady Friend (uncredited)
 Ruthless (1948) as Bella
 The Time of Your Life (1948) as 'Killer'
 Bad Men of Tombstone (1949) as Nellie
 The Barkleys of Broadway (1949) as Marie (uncredited)
 The Crime Doctor's Diary (1949) as Louise (uncredited)
 It's a Great Feeling (1949) as Grace
 On the Town (1949) as Nightclub Patron (uncredited)
 The Reckless Moment (1949) as Blond (uncredited)
 Red Light (1949) as Waitress (uncredited)
 Satan's Cradle (1949) as Belle
 Shockproof (1949) as Florrie Kobiski (uncredited)
 Born Yesterday (1951) as Helen
 Honeychile (1951) as Betty Loring
 The Son of Dr. Jekyll (1951) as Hazel Sorelle (uncredited)
 Two of a Kind (1951) as Minnie Mitt (uncredited)
 Westward the Women (1951) as Flashy Woman (uncredited)
 Death of a Salesman (1952) as Miss Francis
 Bal Tabarin (1952) as Stella Simmons
 The Fighter (1952) as Stella
 Ride the Man Down (1952) as Amelia
 Jubilee Trail (1954) as Estelle the Madam (uncredited)
 Witness to Murder (1954) as May - Mental Patient
 Love Me or Leave Me (1955) as Claire (uncredited)
 Accused of Murder (1956) as Marge Harris
 The Black Sleep (1956) as Carmona Daly
 Slander (1957) as Elsie (uncredited)
 The Buster Keaton Story (1957) as Myra Keaton
 The Careless Years (1957) as Aunt Martha (uncredited)
 Death in Small Doses (1957) as Mabel (uncredited)
 My Gun Is Quick (1957) as Proprietess
 Reform School Girl (1957) as Mrs. Rita Horvath
 Unwed Mother (1958) as Mrs. Miller
 Fort Massacre (1958) as Adele
 A Lust to Kill (1958) as Minny
 The Miracle of the Hills (1959) as Sally
 Devil's Partner (shot in 1958, released in 1961) as Ida

References

External links

 
 
 

1913 births
1979 deaths
20th-century American actresses
American stage actresses
Actresses from New York City
American television actresses
Burials at Forest Lawn Memorial Park (Hollywood Hills)
New York (state) Democrats
California Democrats